Odostomia dalsumi is a species of sea snail, a marine gastropod mollusk in the family Pyramidellidae, the pyrams and their allies.

Description
The shell of this micromollusc grows to a length of 1 mm.

Distribution
This species occurs in the following locations:
 Cape Verde

References

External links
 
 To Encyclopedia of Life

dalsumi
Gastropods described in 1998
Gastropods of Cape Verde